Mbabane West is an inkhundla of Eswatini, located in the Hhohho District.  Its population as of the 2007 census was 23,489.

References
Statoids.com, retrieved December 11, 2010

Populated places in Hhohho Region